Michael Barnes may refer to:

Politicians
 Michael Barnes (British politician) (1932–2018), British Labour MP
 Michael Barnes (North Carolina politician), acting mayor of Charlotte, North Carolina
 Michael D. Barnes (born 1943), Maryland Representative

Sportspeople
 Mike Barnes (American football) (born 1950), American football player
 Michael Barnes (cricketer) (born 1985), English cricketer
 Michael Barnes (footballer) (born 1988), English footballer
 Michael Barnes (judoka) (born 1973), American judoka
 Michael Barnes (motorcyclist) (born 1968), American motorcycle racer

Characters
 Mike Barnes, fictional character from the 1989 movie The Karate Kid Part III, and Cobra Kai, Season 5
 Mike Barnes (Hollyoaks), a fictional character on British soap opera, Hollyoaks

Others
 Michael Barnes (arts administrator) (1932–2008), director of the Belfast Festival at Queens and the Grand Opera House, Belfast
 Michael Barnes (musician), lead singer of Christian rock band RED